Contemporary Tibetan art refers to the art of modern Tibet, or Tibet after 1950. It also refer to art by the Tibetan diaspora, which is explicitly political, religious and personal in nature. Contemporary Tibetan art goes beyond Thanka paintings. Often dealing with complex sociopolitical realities.

References

External links
Mechak Center for Contemporary Tibetan Art
Peak Art Gallery, A Contemporary Tibetan Art Gallery
Sweet Tea House Art Gallery
https://theculturetrip.com/asia/articles/10-contemporary-tibetan-artists-and-where-to-find-them/
http://rossirossi.com

Art
Art
Tibetan art